Por Bazaar is a 2014 Marathi language thriller film which is produced by video Palace and directed by Manva Naik. It stars Sai Tamhankar, Swarangi Marathe, Satya Manjrekar, Anurag Worlikar, Dharmaj Joshi, Sakheel Parchure, and Ankush Chaudhari in negative role. Swapnil Joshi and Farhan Akhtar does a cameo in the film.

Plot 
One day, five college friends skip class and come across a house conducting seemingly strange activities. Soon, they find a bunch of innocent kids trapped inside and decide to investigate.

Cast 
 Ankush Chaudhari 
 Sai Tamhankar
 Chitra Nawathe 
 Swanand Kirkire 
 Chinmayee Sumeet
 Prajakta Kulkarni
 Swarangi Marathe
 Satya Manjrekar
 Anurag Worlikar
 Dharmaj Joshi
 Sakheel Parchure

Soundtrack

References

2014 films
Indian thriller films
2010s Marathi-language films
2014 thriller films